William Oliver (5 February 1800 29 October 1848) was a Tyneside poet, singer and songwriter from Newcastle upon Tyne. Possibly his best known work is the song "Newcassel Props", an example of Geordie dialect.

Early life 
Oliver was born in The Side, near the Quayside, Newcastle upon Tyne. His father was a cheesemonger and had his own business.

Career 
Oliver became a draper and hatter, working for a Mr Bowes of The Bridge End, Gateshead, and staying there for many years. For a short while, he ran his own business as a hatter, but this was unsuccessful. He eventually left the business around 1830 and joined his brother Timothy working in his grocery shop situated at the corner of Cloth Market and High Bridge, and there he stayed until his death.

Music 

Oliver was popular as both singer and songwriter in his time. His 1829 collection of songs was dedicated to Robert Bill, Mayor of Newcastle upon Tyne.

Personal life 
He was politically motivated, sympathized with the protestors for reforms, and was a keen supporter of the 1832 Reform Bill. Oliver was also a member of several of the reformist societies, such as Sons of Apollo, Stars of Friendship, and the Corinthian Society (that held its meetings at the Blue Posts, Pilgrim Street, Newcastle upon Tyne).

William Oliver, like his brother Timothy, was unmarried. He died 29 or 30 October 1848 aged 48, and was buried in Westgate Hill General Cemetery, Arthur's Hill, Newcastle upon Tyne. The Newcastle Courant described him as "much respected".

Works
His works include:

  "The Bonassus" – the tale of a buffalo in a wild animal show; to the tune of "Jemmy Joneson's Whurry"
  "The Clock Face" to the tune "Bold Dragoon"
  "England Awake" – a political song
  "The Lament" to the tune "The Bold Dragoon"
  "The New Markets" – to the tune "Canny Newcassel"
  "Newcassel Props" – in which we remember the passing of local characters, with a small part dedicated to those still living; this is considered by many to be one of the best of the old Tyneside songs
  "Newcastle Hackney Coaches" – to the tune "The Bold Dragoon"
  "The Newcastle Millers" – about the great prize fight of October 1824 in which Jim Wallace defeated Tom Dunn for a purse of 40 sovereigns; to the tune "The Bold Dragoon"
  "Shields Chain Bridge"
  "Tim Tunbelly" – to the tune "Canny Newcassel"
  "To the Mechanics Institute of Newcastle upon Tyne"
  "Tom Carr and Waller Watson" (or "Tom and Jerry at Home") – to the tune "Bold Dragoon"

See also 
Geordie dialect words

References

External links

Allan's Illustrated Edition of Tyneside Songs and Readings &c.1891 (pp.228–234: Section on William Oliver, including some of his lyrics)
Farne folk archives 
Songs of the Tyne

1800 births
1848 deaths
English male singer-songwriters
Geordie songwriters
Musicians from Newcastle upon Tyne
People from Gateshead
Musicians from Tyne and Wear
Writers from Tyne and Wear
19th-century composers
19th-century English writers
19th-century poets
19th-century British male singers
19th-century English poets
19th-century English musicians
19th-century English male writers